National Scouting and Guiding organisations are divided into different age groups in order to deliver the Scouting and Guiding programmes for a full range of youth.

History
Originally, there was only a single section for all members of the Scouting (Scouts) and Guiding (Girl Guides and Girl Scouts) Movements. Typically, these were for 11–17 year olds, although the exact ages varied between the countries and organisations.

Within the first twenty-five years of Scouting its founder, Robert Baden-Powell, saw that there was a demand to provide the Scouting programme for young people both above and below the core age range.

The first section to have a separate programme to the Scouts were the Wolf Cubs. This development allowed the younger brothers of Scouts to participate in similar activities. Later on, a senior section known as Rover Scouts was created. This was mirrored by similar sections being created for the Guide Movement — the Brownie Guides (equivalent to the Wolf Cubs) and Ranger Guides (the senior section).

In addition to the expansion of the age ranges, new programmes which ran parallel to the core Scout method were developed. For example, the Sea Scouts and Air Scouts. Another parallel programme is Extension Scouting, which aims to bring Scouting to young people with special needs.

Over time, the various Scouting and Guiding organisations around the world have continued to adapt their programmes to meet the requirements of the society they function in. However, while the age ranges and names vary, the core principles of the Scout or Guide Method are applied throughout.

Sections around the world
There are a number of similarities in the Scouting and Guiding sections around the world, and the following articles contain generic information on the various age groups:

In most countries a local organisation, a Scout Group, combines different sections together into a single body.

The following table contains links to articles with information on specific sectional programmes within the various organisations where available:

Africa

Benin

Burkina Faso

Burundi

Cameroon

Central African Republic

Chad

Democratic Republic of the Congo

Côte d'Ivoire

Ethiopia

Gabon

Ghana

Kenya

Mali

Mauritania

Morocco

Mozambique

Nigeria

Rwanda

Senegal

Seychelles

South Africa

Sudan

Tanzania

Togo

Tunisia

Asia

Afghanistan

Armenia

Bahrain

Bangladesh

Brunei

Hong Kong

India

Indonesia

Japan

Kazakhstan

Kyrgyzstan

Lebanon

Macau

Malaysia

Mongolia

Nepal

Pakistan

Philippines

Singapore

Sri Lanka

Taiwan

Tajikistan

Thailand

Vietnam

Europe

Austria

Belgium

Bosnia and Herzegovina

Bulgaria

Croatia

Cyprus

Czech Republic

Denmark

Estonia

Finland

France

Georgia

Germany

Greece

Hungary

Iceland

Republic of Ireland and/or Northern Ireland
Guiding and Scouting in Northern Ireland are administered by Irish and UK organisations, respectively.

Italy

Latvia

Liechtenstein

Lithuania

Luxembourg

Republic of Macedonia

Malta

Moldova

Monaco

The Netherlands

Norway

Poland

Portugal

Romania

Serbia

Slovakia

Slovenia

Spain

Sweden

Switzerland

Turkey

Ukraine

United Kingdom
Guiding and Scouting in Northern Ireland is served by Irish and UK organisations.

North and Central America

Antigua and Barbuda

Aruba

Bahamas

Barbados

Canada

Costa Rica

Dominica

Dominican Republic

El Salvador

Guatemala

Haïti

Jamaica

Mexico

Netherlands Antilles

Panama

Trinidad and Tobago

United States

South America

Argentina

Bolivia

Brazil

Chile

Colombia

Ecuador

Guyana

Paraguay

Peru

Suriname

Uruguay

Venezuela

Oceania

Australia

New Zealand

Papua New Guinea

See also

 Scouting
 World Association of Girl Guides and Girl Scouts
 World Organization of the Scout Movement
 List of highest awards in Scouting

References

Scouting